Gamma subunit may refer to:

ATP synthase gamma subunit
G gamma subunit; see  GGL domain
G beta gamma subunit; see Beta-gamma complex
Gamma g subunit; see Heterotrimeric G protein
Hemoglobin subunit gamma-1; see HBG1
Hemoglobin subunit gamma-2; see HBG2

See also
Gamma secretase
Laminin, gamma 1
Laminin, gamma 2